Lauriston Castle is a 16th-century tower house with 19th-century extensions overlooking the Firth of Forth, in Edinburgh, Scotland. It lies on Cramond Road South, between Cramond, Davidson's Mains, and Silverknowes. The substantial grounds, Lauriston Castle Gardens, operate as a local park. The castle was bequeathed to the Edinburgh Corporation (post 1975 known as Edinburgh City Council) and hosts the Lord Provost's annual Garden Party. The house is a Category A listed building and the grounds are included in the Inventory of Gardens and Designed Landscapes in Scotland.

History

A Lauriston Castle stood on this site in medieval times but was almost totally destroyed in the raids on Edinburgh in 1544 by the Earl of Hertford's troops.

A tower house was rebuilt around 1590 by Sir Archibald Napier of Merchiston, father of John Napier, for his first son by his second marriage, also named Archibald (1575–1600), known as Napier of Woolmet. Logically, this would be no earlier than 1596, the age of legal majority then being 21. There is no evidence that he ever occupied Lauriston Castle, and he was murdered in 1600, returning to his home, Woolmet House, south of Edinburgh. It is likely that Lauriston was instead occupied by William Napier (c. 1577–1622), the second son of his second marriage. What is certain is that in 1622 the property was inherited by Alexander Napier (the third son of the second marriage) who four years later adopted the title "Lord Laurieston". Lord Laurieston died in 1629, but the house continued to be occupied by his widow and three young children.

In 1683, the estate was purchased by Edinburgh goldsmith and financier William Law, father of infamous economist John Law (1671–1729), shortly before his death. John Law then inherited the estate and it stayed in the family until 1823 when sold to banker and mineralogist Thomas Allan. There is no evidence that the Law family ever resided at Lauriston during their 140 years of ownership. In 1827, Allan commissioned William Burn (1789–1870) to extend the house in the Jacobean style. Subsequent owners were the Right Hon. Andrew Lord Rutherfurd (1791–1854), and Thomas Macknight Crawfurd of Cartsburn and Lauriston Castle, 8th Baron of Cartsburn from 1871 to 1902.

On 3 December 1827 Sir Walter Scott wrote in his journal: "Went with Tom Allan to see his building at Lauriston where he has  good taste; supporting instead of tearing down or destroying the old Chateau which once belonged to the famous Mississippi Law. The additions are in very good taste and will make a most comfortable house."  

William Robert Reid, proprietor of Morison & Co., an Edinburgh cabinetmaking business, acquired Lauriston Castle in 1902, installed modern plumbing and electricity, and he and his wife Margaret filled the house with a collection of fine furniture and artwork. The Reids, being childless, left their home to Scotland on the condition that it should be preserved unchanged. The City of Edinburgh has administered the house since Mrs Reid's death in 1926, which today offers a glimpse of Edwardian life in a Scottish country house. Lauriston Castle was bequeathed to the nation of Scotland in 1926 and is held in Trust by The City of Edinburgh Council. It holds many similarities with the Estate of John and Mabel Ringling, left to the State of Florida in 1926. In 1925, John Fairley, who was to become a Trustee of Lauriston Castle Estate and its first live onsite curator wrote a limited edition book, of 350 copies, entitled "Lauriston Castle" detailing the history of the Castle and Estate - the holy grail for Lauriston Castle enthusiasts.

In 1905, during one of its numerous refurbishments, a stone carving of an astrological horoscope was installed in the outer wall, on the south-west corner. The horoscope was reputedly done by John Napier for his brother. It can be seen in some pictures on the front wall, beneath the leftmost stair tower, near the ground.

In 2013 it was suggested that the castle could be renovated and turned into an official residence for the Lord Provost of Edinburgh, but the proposal did not go ahead due to costs and other reasons.

Design

Lauriston Castle was originally a four-storey, stone L plan tower house, with a circular stair tower, with two-storey angle turrets complete with gun loops. A Jacobean range was added in 1827, to convert it to a country manor. This was designed by the prominent architect William Burn.

The majority of the interior is Edwardian.

Gardens

The extensive gardens at Lauriston are open to the public at no charge and include a number of different styles and forms. The most recent addition is a notable Japanese garden of one hectare. The garden, built by Takashi Sawano, and dedicated as the Edinburgh–Kyoto Friendship Garden, opened in August 2002.

At the back of the castle, there are beautiful views of the Firth of Forth and beyond to Fife, which are enjoyed by members of the Edinburgh Croquet Club on the three croquet lawns laid out on the castle grounds between 1950 and 1955.

To the north-east, the gardens include some excellent mature examples of monkey puzzle trees (Araucaria araucana).

The site is also famed for its bluebell wood but the size of this was much reduced by the formation of the Japanese Garden.

Ghost
Lauriston Castle, like many other Scottish castles, is reputedly haunted.  It is said that the sound of ghostly footsteps can be heard.

References

External links

Description of Lauriston with photo
Lauriston Castle official website
Edinburgh Croquet Club
Friendship Garden
"Stravaiging Around Scotland: 'Lauriston Castle'"
Engraving of Lauriston Castle by James Fittler in the digitised copy of Scotia Depicta, or the antiquities, castles, public buildings, noblemen and gentlemen's seats, cities, towns and picturesque scenery of Scotland, 1804 at National Library of Scotland

Castles in Edinburgh
Houses in Edinburgh
Clan Napier
Inventory of Gardens and Designed Landscapes
Category A listed buildings in Edinburgh
Listed castles in Scotland
Japanese gardens
Gardens in Edinburgh
Parks and commons in Edinburgh
Historic house museums in Edinburgh
Reportedly haunted locations in Edinburgh
Tower houses in Scotland